Jazep Drazdovič (1888–1954) was a Belarusian painter, archaeologist, and ethnographer.

Born in the present day Hłybokaje District in the family of a landless nobleman, Drazdovič studied in Vilnius under Ivan Trutnev. Today Drazdovič's works are preserved in National Museum of Lithuania, Belarusian National Arts Museum, and Belarusian National History Museum.

Early life 

Jazep was born on October 13, 1888, in the village of Punki, Dzisna County, Vilna Province, in the family of an impoverished nobleman. When he was two, his father died; Jazep and his five brothers were raised by their mother, and soon the family was left without land and a home. The family often had to change their place of residence, renting land. Drazdovich began his studies with a private teacher, then he studied at the Dzisna Gymnasium, and in 1906 moved to Vilnius, where he entered the art school of the famous Russian painter Ivan Trutnev, which he graduated in 1908. Drazdovich worked in art workshops and planned to go abroad to earn money.

Drazdovich was greatly influenced by the Belarusian national revival. At this time, he made his first steps in art: he created a series of graphic works with landscapes of the Dzisna region, decorated the cover of the "First Belarusian Calendar for 1910", published by Nasha Niva.

In 1910 he was drafted into the Russian army. After two years of service in Saratov, he graduated from paramedic courses and began working in a clinic. Drazdovich met the First World War in the active army, with a reserve battalion on the Western Front. Due to difficult working conditions, Jazep Drazdovich fell ill with typhoid fever and was hospitalized for two months. After a seven-month vacation to visit his homeland, he returned to the army.

Gallery

Historical-themed works

Architecture

Cosmos

Sceneries

Carpets

References

Belarusian painters
1888 births
1954 deaths
Soviet painters